Kenji Suzuki may refer to:

, Japanese television announcer
, Japanese special effects director and actor
, Japanese footballer
, better known as Damo Suzuki, Japanese musician

See also
Suzuki (disambiguation)